Lance Ball (born June 19, 1985) is a former American football running back. He was signed by the St. Louis Rams as an undrafted free agent in 2008. He played college football at the University of Maryland.

Ball has also been a member of the Indianapolis Colts, Tennessee Titans, and Denver Broncos.

Early years
Ball is a 2003 graduate of Teaneck High School in Teaneck, New Jersey, where he rushed for 3,403 yards and 39 touchdowns in his high school career.

College career

Ball played college football at the University of Maryland. He had four 100-yard games in his last seven starts during his sophomore season, and emerged as one of the top running backs in the ACC, rushing for 903 yards with six touchdowns. He was the third-leading rusher in the conference with an 82.1 per-game average, and earned second-team All-ACC honors. In his junior season, he again led the team in rushing with 815 yards. He majored in family studies and minored in community health. As a senior, he had 768 rushing yards and 12 rushing touchdowns.

Professional career

St. Louis Rams
Ball was not selected in the 2008 NFL Draft, but was signed as an undrafted free agent by the St. Louis Rams.  He was signed to their practice squad on September 1, 2008. He was released from the practice squad on September 30.

Indianapolis Colts
Ball was signed to the practice squad of the Indianapolis Colts on October 12, 2008. He was activated from the practice squad on December 28, 2008 and had his NFL debut on the same date.

An exclusive-rights free agent in the 2009 offseason, Ball was re-signed by the Colts on March 17.

Tennessee Titans
On October 8, 2009, Ball was signed to the Tennessee Titans practice squad.

Denver Broncos
Ball was signed to the Denver Broncos' practice squad on November 3. Ball was signed to a reserve/futures contract on January 5, 2010. On September 21, 2010, Ball was waived by the Denver Broncos. On the 2010 season, he had 158 rushing yards in ten games.

Ball caught a touchdown pass on September 12, 2011 in Denver's season opener against the Oakland Raiders. On November 13, 2011, running back Knowshon Moreno suffered an injury, opening the door for Ball to rush for 96 yards on 30 carries in a win over the Kansas City Chiefs.

After Moreno was declared out for the year, Ball finished the 2011 season with 96 carries for 402 yards and a score (all career highs). In the 2012 season, he had 42 carries for 158 rushing yards and a rushing touchdown to go along with seven receptions for 61 yards and a receiving touchdown. He was released on August 31, 2013.

References

External links
Denver Broncos bio
Maryland Terrapins bio

1985 births
Living people
Players of American football from New Jersey
Sportspeople from Bergen County, New Jersey
Teaneck High School alumni
American football running backs
Maryland Terrapins football players
St. Louis Rams players
Indianapolis Colts players
Tennessee Titans players
Denver Broncos players